Vignan Schools, located in several places in Andhra Pradesh and Telangana, India, consists of 20 campuses. Established in 1982, Vignan started as Vignan Tutorials and in 1983 started its first high school.

History
Vignan Group of Schools were established as Vignan Tutorials in 1982 by Dr.L. Rathaiah who completed his postgraduation and doctoral thesis on child psychology. He started Vignan High School in 1983. His childhood goal of educating the people around him has resulted in lakhs of students receiving quality education in his institutions.

Campuses
Vignan Group of Schools are located at over 20 locations all over Andhra Pradesh and Telangana covering seven different cities.

Hyderabad
Vignan Bo Tree School, Nizampet
Vignan Global Gen School, Madinaguda
Vignan Varsity School, Deshmukhi
Vignan's Prabodhananda Prashanti Niketan, Ghatkesar
Vignan's Global Gen School, Medchal
Vignan Global Gen School, ECIL
Vignan World One School, Kondapur
Vignan Vidyalayam,Patancheru

Guntur
Vignan High School, LIC Colony
Vignan Residential High School, Palakaluru
Vignan Little Public School, Brindavan Gardens
Nandi Next Gen School, Nandipadu

Vizag
Vignan Steel City Public School, Duvvada
Vignan Vidyalayam High School, Siripuram
Vignan Vidyalayam High School, Thimmapuram

Rajahmundry
Vignan Global Gen School, Diwan Cheruvu
Vignan Cotton School, Pitlavani Cheruvu

Ongole
Vignan Global Gen School, Ongole

Eluru
Vignan's Green Fields Public School, Bhogapuram

Khammam
Rahul Vignan Vidyalayam, Charla

Academics

CBSE
Some of the Vignan schools follow CBSE syllabus and some SSC. Vignan Bo Tree School in Nizampet and world one in Kondapur provides CBSE syllabus.

Student activities

Vignanothsav
Vignanothsav is a unique initiative taken by Vignan Global Gen Schools to bring together students of schools from all over the state to participate in sports, literary and cultural competitions and showcase their talents.

Vignite
V-Ignite, a newsletter from Vignan Vidyalayas, is the only newsletter published by students of Vignan. It is described as of the students, by the students and for the students. It contains information of the events taking place in Vignan Group of Schools.

Facilities
 Vignan's library has a good collection of books on various topics and subjects, in addition to the magazines and periodicals, daily newspapers and a wide range of reference books, to suit the reading tastes of different age groups of children.
 E-Class facility helps students to visualize content easily. Vignan got the entire syllabus from Next Education India Pvt. Ltd. (Teach Next), one of the leading content providers in India, to make the classroom instruction more effective and enjoyable.
 Vignan provides its students with good lab facilities including computer labs.
 Hostel rooms are well ventilated and hygienic. Students are groomed in dining etiquette, eating and sharing in groups, avoiding food wastage and so on when they sit for their meals in the common dining hall. A mineral water plant provides purified water to students. Solar heating facilities enable hygienic cooking besides providing students with hot water for bathing.
 Vignan's sprawling grounds facilitate playing tennis, skating, volleyball, throw ball, basketball, hockey, karate, tae-kwon-do, kabbadi, badminton, kho-kho, cricket, yoga, shot put, sprint, long jump, and disc throw. There is a separate playfield for pre-primary children.
Art, painting, craft, dance and music. Students are encouraged to join in different student clubs and participate in activities like painting and other fine arts, soft-toy making, literary activities, and gardening.

Notable alumni
Hari Krishna Pentala
Venkata jogi naidu Challa

References

External links
 

High schools and secondary schools in Andhra Pradesh
Schools in Telangana
Education in Telangana
1982 establishments in Andhra Pradesh
Educational institutions established in 1982